Disk density is a capacity designation on magnetic storage, usually floppy disks. Each designation describes a set of characteristics that can affect the areal density of a disk or the efficiency of the encoded data. Such characteristics include modulation method, track width, coercivity, and magnetic field direction.

8-inch media 
Single density (SD or 1D) describes the first generation of floppy disks that use an iron oxide coating.

Double density (DD or 2D) doubles capacity over SD by replacing FM encoding with an improved line code, such as modified frequency modulation (MFM), modified modified frequency modulation (M²FM), FM/MFM or group coded recording (GCR).

5¼-inch media 
SD (1D) and DD (2D) designations were generally identical to those of 8-inch disks.

Some manufacturers (Micropolis, Tandon, Micro Peripherals (MPI), Teac) used a track density of 100 tpi for quad-density drives, which were incompatible with 96 tpi models.

The Commodore 8050 and 8250 are rare instanced of drives that used 375 kbit/s GCR code instead of the usual 250 kbit/s double density format and they could store roughly 500 kilobytes on one side of a disk.

High density (HD) improves capacity by utilizing a 96 tpi track density in conjunction with improved cobalt disk coating and stronger 600-oersted write heads, allowing 9,646 bpi to be written.

3½-inch media 
Double density (DD) 3½-inch disks use an iron oxide coating, just as with 5¼-inch DD/QD disks.

High density (HD) 3½-inch disks switch to a cobalt disk coating, just as with 5¼-inch HD disks. Drives use 700-oersted write heads for a density of 17,434 bpi.

Extra-high density (ED) doubles the capacity over HD by using a barium ferrite coating and a special write head that allows the use of perpendicular recording.

Triple density (TD) triples the capacity over ED by tripling the track density and improving other parameters. The drives used longitudinal recording.

Overview

See also 
List of floppy disk formats

References

External links 
 

Floppy disk computer storage